The Mayo county hurling team represents Mayo in hurling and is governed by Mayo GAA, the county board of the Gaelic Athletic Association. The team competes in the Christy Ring Cup and the National Hurling League. It formerly competed in the abolished Connacht Senior Hurling Championship.

Mayo's home ground is MacHale Park, Castlebar. The team's manager is vacant.

The team last won the Connacht Senior Championship in 1909, but has never won the All-Ireland Senior Championship or the National League.

History
Although not a traditional hurling county, hurling is strong in certain parts of the county especially in the eastern region around Ballyhaunis and Tooreen. Mayo has four senior hurling clubs, each of which provides players for the Mayo senior hurling panel, which participates in the National Hurling League and the All-Ireland Nicky Rackard (Tier 3) Cup.

Mayo has 10 clubs which provide players for the Mayo underage hurling development panels. Mayo has development panels at under-14, under-15, under-16 and minor age-groups, and compete in the All-Ireland 'B' competitions each year.

The Mayo under-21 hurling team competes in the Connacht U-21B Hurling Championship each year alongside Leitrim, Roscommon and Sligo.

Mayo's best performances in the Christy Ring Cup came in 2008 and 2009, when the Mayo side fell at the semi-final stage to Carlow and Down respectively.

Mayo won the 2016 Nicky Rackard Cup, defeating Armagh by a scoreline of 2–16 to 1–15 at Croke Park.

Mayo lost the 2020 Nicky Rackard Cup Final to Donegal by a scoreline of 3–18 to 0–21.

Current panel

INJ Player has had an injury which has affected recent involvement with the county team.
RET Player has since retired from the county team.
WD Player has since withdrawn from the county team due to a non-injury issue.

Current management team
Manager: Vacant

Managerial history
Mark Deeley 1997–2001

Gerry Kilbride 2001

Mattie Murphy Galway 2001–2002

Gerry Spellman or Spelman Galway 2003–2005

Frank Browne Wexford/Ballyhaunis 2005–2006

Martin Brennan Westport 2006–2011

Murt Connolly Galway 2011–2012

Christy Phillips Limerick 2013–2014

J P. Coen 2015–?

Derek Walsh Ballyhaunis 2018–2022

Vacant 2022–

Players

Notable players

Captaincy
Shane Boland: 2022

Records
Mayo's most famous hurlers:
Joe Henry (Tooreen), who won Railway Cup medals with Connacht in the 1980s
Keith Higgins (Ballyhaunis), the dual player who played for the county football team in many's an All-Ireland Senior Football Championship final from 2006 onwards
Shane Boland, 2022 captain, finished as top scorer in the 2022 Christy Ring Cup
Shane Crinnigan, Tooreen - Four Connaught Medals for Tooreen (2017, 2019, 2021, 2022)

Honours

National
All-Ireland Senior Hurling Championship
 Semi-finalists (1): 1909
All-Ireland Senior B Hurling Championship/Joe McDonagh Cup
 Runners-up (1): 2004
All-Ireland Intermediate Hurling Championship/Christy Ring Cup
 Runners-up (1): 2022
 Semi-finalists (3): 2008, 2009, 2014
All-Ireland Junior Hurling Championship/Nicky Rackard Cup
 Winners (5): 1980, 1981, 2003, 2016, 2021
 Runners-up (3): 1976, 1978, 2020
All-Ireland Minor C Hurling Championship
 Winners (2): 2013, 2014

Provincial
Connacht Senior Hurling Championship
 Winners (1): 1909
 Runners-up (1): 1905
Connacht Intermediate Hurling Championship
 Winners (2): 1969, 2014
 Runners-up (2): 1968, 2013
Connacht Junior Hurling Championship
 Winners (3): 1936, 1967, 2004
 Runners-up (10): 1934, 1935, 1939, 1950, 1959, 1960, 1964, 1965, 1972, 1975
Jim Hogan Couriers Connacht U21 Hurling Championship
 Winners (2): 2015, 2016
Connacht Minor Hurling Championship
 Winners (1): 1964
 Runners-up (2): 1935, 1952

References

 
County hurling teams